Pygmaepterys oxossi is a species of sea snail, a marine gastropod mollusk in the family Muricidae, the murex snails or rock snails.

Description

Distribution
This species occurs in the Atlantic Ocean off Brazil.

References

External links
 Petuch, E. J. (1979). New gastropods from the Abrolhos Archipelago and reef complex, Brazil. Proceedings of the Biological Society of Washington 92(3):510-526. 4: figs

Muricidae
Gastropods described in 1979